Kandanisseri Vattamparambil Velappan Ayyappan (9 July 1923 – 2 June 2010) or V. V. Ayyappan, better known by his pen name Kovilan, was an Indian Malayalam language novelist and freedom fighter from Kerala. He is considered one of the most prolific writers of contemporary Indian literature. In all, he had authored 11 novels, 10 collections of short stories, three essays and a play.

He won the Kerala Sahitya Akademi Award in 1972 and 1977 and the Kendra Sahitya Akademi Award in 1998. He was also a recipient of the Kerala state government's highest literary honour Ezhuthachan Puraskaram in recognition of his outstanding contribution to Malayalam literature. He had been a Fellow of the Kerala Sahitya Akademi since 1997 and Sahitya Akademi since 2005.

Life

Early years
Kovilan was born in Kandanassery in Guruvayur, Thrissur to Vattomparambil Shanku Velappan and Kotakkattil Kunjandi Kali. He did his early education at the Kandanisseri Excelsior School and Nenmini Higher Elementary School. He then joined the Sahitya Deepika Sanskrit College at Pavaratty at the age of 13. He attended classes of K. P. Narayana Pisharody, P. C. Vasudevan Elayathu, M. P. Sankunni Nair, Cherukadu and Srikrishna Sharma. Even as a student, he had shown interest in writing poems and stories. 

A follower of Mahatma Gandhi, Kovilan left the Sanskrit College to participate in the Quit India Movement. That marked the end of his formal academic education. By the time he quit, he had written at least three novels.

Military life
He joined the Royal Indian Navy in 1943 and was trained in Anti-submarine Detecting Operations. He served in Bengal sea, Burma and Singapore. He quit following the Royal Indian Navy mutiny of 1946 and returned home. While back in Kerala, Kovilan maintained a close friendship with Vaikom Muhammed Basheer, Joseph Mundassery and C. J. Thomas. He also took part in the trade union movements. In 1948 he passed SSLC and worked for a while as a stenographer for Joseph Mundassery. In 1948, he joined the Indian Army Corps of Signals as Radio Mechanic. He also specialised in electronics. For five years he lived in the Himalayas. While in army, he came in contact with soldier-turned-writers Parappurath and Nandanar. He also worked as National Cadet Corps training officer at the Indian Institute of Technology, Kanpur. He retired from the Indian Army in 1968 as Havildar Major and settled down at Pullanikunnu at Kandanassery.

Death

Kovilan died on 2 June 2010 in Kunnamkulam, aged 86.

Writings

Kovilan has written 4 novels—A Minus B (1958), Ezhamedangal (Army Wives, 1965), Thazhvarakal (The Valleys, 1969) and Himalayam—with military experiences as their background.

Thottangal (Incantations, 1970), the first post-service novel of the writer, narrates the delirious memories of an old woman in the night of her death whose life was shipwrecked turning the dreams of her childhood into nightmares. 

His most popular novel was Thattakam (The Terrain, 1995). 

Kovilan's first collection of short stories was Oru Palam Manayola (A Measure of Red Arsenic). This book was published in the year 1957. The story Tharavadu (Ancestral Home) is included in this collection. Kovilan's other collections of short stories include Ee Jeevitham Ananthamanu (1957), Orikkal Manushyanayirunnu (1960), Oru Kashanam Asthi (1961), Vendam Kadi (1969), Thervazhchakal (1971), Pitham (1971), Shakunam (1974), Adyathe Kathakal (1978), Sujatha (1979), Theranjedutha Kathakal (1980) and Kovilante Kathakal (1985). A tele-serial based on his novel Thottangal was beamed on Doordarshan. Some of his short stories also have been adapted for tele-screen.

Style and recurring themes

According to one source, Kovilan's works contributed to transforming a community bogged down by conservatism to one that was progressive and socialist in outlook.

Poet and critic K. Satchidanandan notes:

Awards

 1971: Kerala Sahitya Akademi Award (Novel) for Thottangal
 1977: Kerala Sahitya Akademi Award (Story) for Sakunam
 1995: Muttathu Varkey Award
 1997: Kerala Sahitya Akademi Fellowship
 1997: A. P. Kulakkad Award for Thattakam
 1998: Kendra Sahitya Academy Award for Thattakam
 1998: Kerala Sahitya Parishath Award for Thattakam
 1999: Vayalar Award for Thattakam
 1999: N. V. Prize for Thattakam
 2004: Sahitya Akademi Fellowship
 2006: Ezhuthachan Award
 2008: Mathrubhumi Literary Award

Bibliography

Novels

Novelettes

Short Stories

Play

Miscellaneous writings

References

Further reading
 Dr. Ajayapuram Jyothishkumar, Kovilan Ezhuthu Desam Prathinidhanam, State Institute of Languages. A study on the writings of Kovilan

External links
 http://www.dvaipayana.net/kovilan/  Kovilan Page at dvaipayana.net
The International Kovilan Study Group
Kovilan Trust
A brief introduction to the novels of Kovilan
Ballads of Rage: An introduction to the short stories by P. Radhakrishnan Nair (in English translation)
Translation of Bharathan: A novel written by Kovilan (in seven chapters)
Translation of Conch: A story written by Kovilan
Translation of M/F: A story written by Kovilan
Tales behind Thottangal (in English translation)
An appreciation of Thottangal by A. Purushothaman (in Malayalam)
When Kovilan constructs story: An appreciation of the story Conch by K. P. Appan (in English translation)
A study of Thottangal by Dr. K. M. Tharakan (in English translation)
Thottangal: A commentary in Malayalam by A. Purushothaman (in 15 chapters)
A craft of his own (Frontline article)
Annorikkal: Kovilan (Documentary by Manorama News)

1923 births
2010 deaths
Respiratory disease deaths in India
Writers from Thrissur
Malayalam novelists
Malayalam-language writers
Recipients of the Ezhuthachan Award
Recipients of the Kerala Sahitya Akademi Award
Recipients of the Sahitya Akademi Award in Malayalam
20th-century Indian novelists
Novelists from Kerala
People from Guruvayur